The 1910 Five Nations Championship was the first series of the rugby union Five Nations Championship following the inclusion of France into the Home Nations Championship. Including the previous Home Nations Championships, this was the twenty-eighth series of the annual northern hemisphere rugby union championship. Ten matches were played between 1 January and 28 March. It was contested by England, France, Ireland, Scotland and Wales.

Table

Results

The matches

Wales vs. France

Wales: Jack Bancroft (Swansea), Phil Hopkins (Swansea), Hopkin Maddock (London Welsh), Jack Jones (Newport), Billy Trew (Swansea) capt., Dick Jones (Swansea), Reggie Gibbs (Cardiff), Joe Pullman (Neath), Ben Gronow (Bridgend), Cliff Pritchard (Newport), Phil Waller (Newport), Jim Webb (Abertillery), Tom Evans (Llanelli), Ivor Morgan (Swansea), Dick Thomas (Newport)

France: R Menrath (SCUF), M Bruneau (S. Bordelais), H Houblain (SCUF), M Burgun (RCF), G Lane (RCF) capt., C Martin (FC Lyon), J Maysonnie (S. Toulouse), P Mauriat (FC Lyon), A Masse (S Bordelais), A Hourdebaigt (S Bordelais), P Guillemin (RCF), R Lafitte (SCUF), G Thevenot (SCUF), M Boudreau (SCUF), J Anduran (SCUF)

England vs. Wales

England: WR Johnston (Bristol), FE Chapman (Westoe), JGG Birkett (Harlequins), RW Poulton (Oxford University), Bert Solomon (Redruth), AD Stoop (Harlequins) capt., DR Gent (Gloucester), HJS Morton (Blackheath), L Haigh (Manchester), WA Johns (Gloucester), DF Smith (Richmond), EL Chambers (Bedford), Harry Berry (Gloucester), LE Barrington-Ward (Edinburgh University), Charles Pillman (Blackheath)

Wales: Jack Bancroft (Swansea), Phil Hopkins (Swansea), Reggie Gibbs (Cardiff), Jack Jones (Pontypool), Billy Trew (Swansea) capt., Dick Jones (Swansea), Dicky Owen (Swansea), Harry Jarman (Newport), Ben Gronow (Bridgend), Cliff Pritchard (Newport), David John Thomas (Swansea), Jim Webb (Abertillery), Tom Evans (Llanelli), Ivor Morgan (Swansea), Joseph Pugsley (Cardiff)

Scotland vs. France

Scotland: FG Buchanan (Oxford University), James Pearson (Watsonians), IPM Robertson (Watsonians), Alex Angus (Watsonians), JT Simson (Watsonians), George Cunningham (Oxford University) capt., JM Tennant (West of Scotland), Louis Spiers (Watsonians), GM Frew (Glasgow HSFP), JC MacCallum (Watsonians), AR Moodie (St Andrews Uni), Charles Stuart (West of Scotland), R.C. Stevenson (St Andrews Uni), JMB Scott (Edinburgh Acads.), GC Gowlland (London Scottish)

France: J Combe (S Francais), E Lesieur (S Francais), J Dedet (S Francais), M Burgun (RCF), C Vareilles (S Francais), C Martin (FC Lyon), A Theuriet (SCUF), M Boudreau (SCUF), J Cadenat (SCUF), A Hourdebaigt (S Bordelais), P Guillemin (RCF), R Lafitte (SCUF), M Communeau (S Francais) capt., A Masse (S Bordelais), P Mauriat (FC Lyon)

Wales vs. Scotland

Wales: Jack Bancroft (Swansea), Billy Spiller (Cardiff), Reggie Gibbs (Cardiff), Mel Baker (Newport), Billy Trew (Swansea) capt., Percy Bush (Swansea), William Llewellyn Morgan (Cardiff), Harry Jarman (Newport), Ben Gronow (Bridgend), Ernie Jenkins (Newport), David John Thomas (Swansea), Jim Webb (Abertillery), Tom Evans (Llanelli), Ivor Morgan (Swansea), Joseph Pugsley (Cardiff)

Scotland: WR Sutherland (Hawick), James Pearson (Watsonians), DG Schulze (London Scottish), Alex Angus (Watsonians), JT Simson (Watsonians), E Milroy (Watsonians), JM Tennant (West of Scotland), Louis Spiers (Watsonians), GM Frew (Glasgow HSFP) capt., JC MacCallum (Watsonians), AR Moodie (St Andrews Uni), Charles Stuart (West of Scotland), R.C. Stevenson (St Andrews Uni), JMB Scott (Edinburgh Acads.), GC Gowlland (London Scottish)

England vs. Ireland

England: WR Johnston (Bristol), FE Chapman (Westoe), JGG Birkett (Harlequins), LW Haywood (Cheltenham), Edgar Mobbs (Northampton), AD Stoop (Harlequins capt., DR Gent (Gloucester), HJS Morton (Blackheath), L Haigh (Manchester), WA Johns (Gloucester), DF Smith (Richmond), EL Chambers (Bedford), Harry Berry (Gloucester), LE Barrington-Ward (Edinburgh University), Charles Pillman (Blackheath)

Ireland: WP Hinton (Old Wesley), C Thompson (Belfast Collegians), AS Taylor (Queen's University), AR Foster (Queen's University), JP Quinn (Dublin University), RA Lloyd (Dublin University), HM Read (Dublin University), OJS Piper (Cork Constitution), JC Blackham (Queen's Co., Cork), GT Hamlet (Old Wesley) capt., T Haplin (Garryowen), Tommy Smyth (Malone), WF Riordan (Cork Constitution), Bethel Solomons (Wanderers), G McIldowie (Malone)

Ireland vs. Scotland

Ireland: WP Hinton (Old Wesley), C Thompson (Belfast Collegians), AS Taylor (Queen's University), AR Foster (Queen's University), JP Quinn (Dublin University), RA Lloyd (Dublin University), HM Read (Dublin University), OJS Piper (Cork Constitution), JC Blackham (Queen's Co., Cork), GT Hamlet (Old Wesley) capt., T Haplin (Garryowen), Tommy Smyth (Newport), H Moore (Queen's University), Bethel Solomons (Wanderers), G McIldowie (Malone)

Scotland:  DG Schulze (London Scottish), DG Macpherson (The London H.), James Pearson (Watsonians), MW Walter (London Scottish), JD Dobson (Glasgow Academicals), G Cunningham (Oxford University) capt., AB Lindsay (The London H.), Cecil Abercrombie (US Portsmouth), GM Frew (Glasgow HSFP), JC MacCallum (Watsonians), JM Mackenzie (Edinburgh Uni.), R.C. Stevenson (St Andrews Uni), JMB Scott (Edinburgh Acads.), GC Gowlland (London Scottish), Charles Stuart (West of Scotland)

France vs. England

France: J Combe (S Francais), E Lesieur (S Francais), G Lane (RCF), M Bruneau (S Bordelais), C Vareilles (S Francais), J Dedet (S Francais), G Latterade (S Tarbes), R de Malmann (RCF), J Cadenat (SCUF), A Hourdebaigt (S Bordelais), P Guillemin (RCF), G Thevenot (SCUF), M Communeau (S Francais) capt., A Masse (S Bordelais), P Mauriat (FC Lyon)

England: CS Williams (Manchester), FE Chapman (Westoe), Alan Adams  (The London H.), Edgar Mobbs (Northampton)  capt., A Hudson (Gloucester), H Coverdale (Blackheath), Anthony Henniker-Gotley (Oxford University), Norman Wodehouse (US Portsmouth), WA Johns (Gloucester), Reginald Hands (Oxford University), ES Scorfield (Percy Park), Harry Berry (Gloucester), JAS Ritson (Northern) LE Barrington-Ward (Edinburgh University), Charles Pillman (Blackheath)

Ireland vs. Wales

Ireland: WP Hinton (Old Wesley), C Thompson (Belfast Collegians) capt., AS Taylor (Queen's University), CT O'Callaghan (Carlow), RK Lyle (Dublin University), AN McClinton (NIFC), WS Smyth (Belfast Collegians), OJS Piper (Cork Constitution), FM McCormac (Wanderers), JC Blackham (Wanderers), T Haplin (Garryowen), Tommy Smyth (Newport), HG Wilson (Malone), Bethel Solomons (Wanderers), G McIldowie (Malone)

Wales: Jack Bancroft (Swansea), Billy Spiller (Cardiff), Reggie Gibbs (Cardiff) capt., Louis Dyke (Cardiff), Johnnie Williams (Cardiff), Percy Bush (Swansea), Tommy Vile (Newport), Harry Jarman (Newport), Ben Gronow (Bridgend), Ernie Jenkins (Newport), David John Thomas (Swansea), Jim Webb (Abertillery), Tom Evans (Llanelli), Ivor Morgan (Swansea), Joseph Pugsley (Cardiff)

External links

Six Nations Championship seasons
Five Nations
Five Nations
Five Nations
Five Nations
Five Nations
Five Nations
Five Nations Championship
Five Nations Championship
Five Nations Championship